Jichișu de Jos is a commune in Cluj County, Transylvania, Romania. It is composed of five villages: Codor (Kodor), Jichișu de Jos, Jichișu de Sus (Felsőgyékényes), Șigău (Sajgó) and Tărpiu (Szekerestörpény).

Demographics 
According to the census from 2002 there was a total population of 1,327 people living in this commune. Of this population, 99.54% are ethnic Romanians,  0.30% ethnic Romani and 0.15% are ethnic Hungarians.

Natives
Ștefan Cicio Pop

References

Communes in Cluj County
Localities in Transylvania